This page shows the results of the Men's Wrestling Competition at the 1995 Pan American Games, held from March 11 to March 26, 1995, in Mar del Plata, Argentina.

Freestyle

Greco-Roman

Medal table

See also
 Wrestling at the 1996 Summer Olympics

References
 Sports 123

Events at the 1995 Pan American Games
P
1995
International wrestling competitions hosted by Argentina